Russula queletii otherwise known as the gooseberry russula, is a common, inedible, Russula mushroom found growing in groups, predominantly in spruce forest.
Eating this mushroom causes abdominal pains.

Description
The cap is hemispherical when young, which later becomes convex. The colour can be wine-red and is usually 5 to 6 cm in diameter but can be up to 10 cm.
The gills are white, which are brittle, and the spores are cream. The stem is a similar colour to the cap and evenly thick. The flesh is white and the scent is fruity.

Similar species 

 Russula sardonia
 Russula torulosa

See also
List of Russula species

References

E. Garnweidner. Mushrooms and Toadstools of Britain and Europe. Collins. 1994.

External links

queletii
Fungi of Europe
Fungi described in 1872
Inedible fungi
Taxa named by Elias Magnus Fries